Government Central Model School, Lahore is a public school in Lahore, Punjab, Pakistan. The school has two independent branches, with independent headmasters; one is near District Court and the other is in the center of Samanabad, near Masjid e Khizra. More than 85,000 students study in the school.

History
Central Model School was established in 1883 as middle school in the building of Anarkali Girls High School, opposite the Punjab University senate hall. The middle school was upgraded to high level in 1888 and shifted to a portion of Central Training College. The space in the training college being insufficient, the school was shifted to the present building in 1891 near District Courts Lahore.

Junior classes were abolished in 1920 by H.T. Nolton, the headmaster, but were restored in 1940 by the first Muslim headmaster of the school, M.A. Makhdumi.

Central Model School served as a laboratory school for the Central Training College from 1891 to 1991.

The school was granted autonomous status in 1990, with its own board of governors.

Campus
CMS Lahore spreads over an area of 23,000 square metres, with a covered area of 14,000 square meters. It has 150 rooms, two halls, a library, seven laboratories, and workshops.

Former headmasters
Mohan Lal Bhalla was the first Indian to serve as headmaster from 1929 to 1940. M.A. Makhdoomi was the first Muslim headmaster, from 1940 to 1947.

M.A. Bari, Ibrahim Shamim and Mian Mahmood Ali served the institution until 1959, when Ghulam Nabi Butt (1959-1970) took over.
Gulzar Ahmed Bhatti,
Muhammad Nazeer

Current headmasters
The current headmaster is Sharif Tahir Chishti.

Change in status
After 2009, CMS came under Commissioner Lahore and its own BOG.

References

Educational institutions established in 1883
Schools in Lahore
1883 establishments in British India